Petr Pokorný (April 21, 1933 – January 18, 2020) was a Protestant theologian, professor at Charles University in Prague, and pastor of the Evangelical Church of Czech Brethren, one of the leading biblical scholars in the Czech Republic. 

For many years, Petr Pokorný led the Department of New Testament Studies at the Protestant Theological Faculty of the Prague University, in 1996–1999 he was the dean of the faculty, later (1998–2010) he was also the director of the Centre for Biblical Studies of the Czech Academy of Sciences and Charles University.

Selected publications

Publications in English
The Genesis of Christology: Foundations for a Theology of the New Testament, Edinburgh: T. & T. Clark, 1987. 
Jesus in the Eyes of His Followers: Newly Discovered Manuscripts and Old Christian Confessions, North Richland Hills, Tex.: BIBAL Press, 1998. 
A Commentary on the Gospel of Thomas: From Interpretations to the Interpreted, New York: T & t Clark Ltd., 2009. 
Hermeneutics as a Theory of Understanding, Grand Rapids: W.B. Eerdmans Pub., 2011. 
From the Gospel to the Gospels. History, Theology and Impact of the Biblical Term 'Euangelion''', Berlin: Walter de Gruyter, 2013. 

Publications in German
 Der Epheserbrief und die Gnosis. Berlin: Evangelische Verlaganstalt, 1965.
 Der Gottessohn: Literarische Übersicht und Fragestellung. Zürich: Theologischer Verlag, 1971.
 Die Entstehung der Christologie. Voraussetzungen einer Theologie des Neuen Testaments, Stuttgart: Calwer, 1985.
 Der Brief des Paulus an die Kolosser, Berlin: Evangelische Verlagsanstalt, 1987. 
 Der Brief des Paulus an die Epheser, Berlin: Evangelische Verlagsanstalt, 1992. 
 Bibelauslegung als Theologie (with Josef Bohumil Souček), Tübingen: Mohr Siebeck, 1997. 
 Theologie der lukanischen Schriften, Goettingen: Vandenhoeck & Ruprecht, 1998. 
 Einleitung in das Neue Testament. Seine Literatur und Theologie im Überblick (with Ulrich Heckel), Tübingen: Mohr Siebeck, 2007. 
 Jesus in Geschichte und Bekenntnis, Tübingen: Mohr Siebeck, 2016. 

Publications in Czech
 Počátky gnose. Vznik gnostického mýtu o božstvu Člověk, Praha: Academia, 1968.
 Píseň o perle: tajné knihy starověkých gnostiků, Praha: Vyšehrad, 1986.
 Literární a teologický úvod do Nového zákona, Praha: Vyšehrad, 1993.  
 Řecké dědictví v Orientu. Helénismus v Egyptě a Sýrii, Praha: Oikúmené, 1993. 
 Apoštolské vyznání. Výklad nejstarších křesťanských věroučných textů. Třebenice: Mlýn, 1994. 
 Co nevíš o Bibli? Úvod do studia Starého a Nového zákona'' (with Miloš Bič), Praha: Česká biblická společnost, 1997.

References

External links

 Memories of Petr Pokorný a biographical article at the website Memory of Nation 

1933 births
2020 deaths
Clergy from Brno
Czech Protestant clergy
Czech theologians
20th-century Protestant theologians
21st-century Protestant theologians
Czech biblical scholars
20th-century Christian biblical scholars
21st-century Christian biblical scholars
Charles University alumni
Academic staff of Charles University